Reforma, the Spanish word meaning reform, has the following meanings:
Historical
 La Reforma, a period of liberal reforms in the history of Mexico beginning in 1855
Guerra de Reforma, a war fought during this period
Towns and settlements
 Reforma, Chiapas, town in southern Mexico
 La Reforma, San Marcos, a municipality in Guatemala
 Santa Lucía La Reforma, a municipality in Guatemala
 Łabunie-Reforma, a village in eastern Poland
 La Reforma, Texas, a community in Starr County, Texas, United States
Streets
 Avenida Reforma, an avenue in Guatemala City
 Paseo de la Reforma, an avenue in Mexico City
Companies and organizations
 Reforma, a daily newspaper published in Mexico City
 Grupo Reforma, parent company of the newspaper
 REFORMA, the U.S. National Association to Promote Library and Information Services to Latinos and the Spanish-speaking
 Reforma, a rock band from Chicago that broke up in 2004. Drummer and guitarist are now in Madina Lake
Buildings
Paseo Reforma, shopping mall in Nuevo Laredo, Tamaulipas, Mexico
Torre Reforma, skyscraper in Mexico City
Geology
La Reforma (caldera), a volcanic feature in Mexico's Baja Peninsula
Transportation
 Reforma (Mexico City Metrobús, Line 1), a BRT station in Mexico City
 Reforma (Mexico City Metrobús, Line 7), a BRT station in Mexico City